In mathematics, an exceptional Lie algebra is a complex simple Lie algebra whose Dynkin diagram is of exceptional (nonclassical) type. There are exactly five of them: ; their respective dimensions are 14, 52, 78, 133, 248. The corresponding diagrams are:
G2 : 
F4 : 
E6 : 
E7 : 
E8 : 

In contrast, simple Lie algebras that are not exceptional are called classical Lie algebras (there are infinitely many of them).

Construction 
There is no simple universally accepted way to construct exceptional Lie algebras; in fact, they were discovered only in the process of the classification program. Here are some constructions:
Exceptional Lie algebras may be realized as the derivation algebras of appropriate nonassociative algebras.
Construct  first and then find  as subalgebras.
Tits has given a uniformed construction of the five exceptional Lie algebras.

References

Further reading 
https://www.encyclopediaofmath.org/index.php/Lie_algebra,_exceptional
http://math.ucr.edu/home/baez/octonions/node13.html

Lie algebras